DigiListan is a Swedish radio programme in SR P3 airing the top singles sold electronically to computers, mobile phones and other kinds of media players in Sweden (downloaded music). The statistics are created using Nielsen SoundScan. 

The programme was first aired in January 2007.

See also
Sverigetopplistan—Swedish national music chart

External links
DigiListan
Listen to all lists on Spotify
Swedish radio programs